The 2007 UMass Minutemen football team represented the University of Massachusetts Amherst in the 2007 NCAA Division I FCS football season as a member of the Colonial Athletic Association (CAA). The team was coached by Don Brown and played its home games at Warren McGuirk Alumni Stadium in Hadley, Massachusetts.  The Minutemen were coming off an appearance in the 2006 NCAA Championship Game and were looking to continue their success following their move from the Atlantic 10 Conference to the CAA.  UMass repeated as conference champions but lost in the Quarterfinals of the NCAA Tournament, finishing the season with a record of 10–3 (7–1 CAA).

Schedule

References

UMass
UMass Minutemen football seasons
Colonial Athletic Association football champion seasons
UMass Minutemen football